Cummings Mountain is a mountain located in the Tehachapi Mountains of central California.

It is located near the town of Tehachapi and State Route 58.

Due to the peaks elevation  snow falls on the summit during the winter months.

References 

Mountains of Kern County, California
Tehachapi Mountains
Mountains of Southern California